Georg Friedrich Puchta (31 August 17988 January 1846) was an important German Legal scholar.

Biography
Born on 31 August 1798 at Kadolzburg in Bavaria, Puchta came of an old Bohemian Protestant family which had immigrated into Germany to avoid religious persecution. His father, Wolfgang Heinrich Puchta (1769–1845), a legal writer and district judge, imbued his son with legal conceptions and principles. From 1811 to 1816 Puchta attended the Egidiengymnasium at Nuremberg, during the headmastership of Georg Wilhelm Friedrich Hegel, an eminent German philosopher.

In 1816 Puchta began his legal studies at the University of Erlangen, where—in addition to being initiated by his father into legal practice—he fell under the influence of the writings of Savigny and Niebuhr. At this time the famous Christian Friedrich von Glück lectured there. Puchta said about the faculty of Erlangen: "Jede Universität ist freilich mit einem Pfahl im Fleisch geplagt, aber die hiesige Fakultät hat, wenn Glück stirbt, nichts als Pfähle". (Translation "Every university certainly is plagued with a thorn in the flesh, but the faculty here, when Glück dies, will have nothing but thorns.") Taking his doctorate (Dissertatio de Itinere, Actu et Via) and his habilitation in Roman Law at Erlangen, he established himself there in 1820 as a Privatdozent.

In 1821 Puchta went on a year-long trip (peregrinatio academica) around Germany to visit important universities. During this trip he met some of the foremost German legal scholars of his time: Gustav Hugo, Friedrich Carl von Savigny und Anton Friedrich Justus Thibaut.

One year later, Puchta was appointed Professor at University of Erlangen (außerordentlicher Professor für Rechtswissenschaft), where he stated on until 1828.

Leaving Erlangen, Puchta was appointed full Professor of Roman Law at University of Munich in 1828. He stated in Munich until 1835 when he went on to the University of Marburg, to become a professor of Roman and Ecclesiastical Law (ordentlicher Professor für römisches Recht und Kirchenrecht) there. In 1837 he left Marburg to become a Professor for Legal Scholarship at Leipzig University (ordentlicher Professor für Rechtswissenschaft).

When Friedrich Carl von Savigny was appointed Minister of Justice of Prussia (Minister für Revision der Gesetzgebung) on 28 February 1842, there was some debate concerning his succession at Berlin University (then named Friedrich-Wilhelms-Universität). Finally Puchta was chosen to succeed him in 1842.

At the pinnacle of this legal career, Puchta was in 1842 appointed to the Supreme Court of Prussia (Preußisches Obertribunal). In 1845 he became a member of the consultative Prussian Council of State (Preußischer Staatsrat) and the Prussian Legislative Commission (Gesetzgebungskommission).

Puchta died suddenly in Berlin on 8 January 1846 due to Miserere.

Legal thinking
His chief merit as a jurist lay in breaking with past unscientific methods in the teaching of Roman law and in making its spirit intelligible to students.

Among his writings must be especially mentioned Lehrbuch der Pandekten (Leipzig, 1838, and many later editions), in which he elucidated the dogmatic essence of Roman law in a manner never before attempted; and the Kursus der Institutionen (Leipzig, 1841–1847, and later editions), which gives a clear picture of the organic development of law among the Romans. Among his other writings are Das Gewohnheitsrecht (Erlangen, 1828–1837) and Einleitung in das Recht der Kirche (Leipzig, 1840).

Kleine civilistische Schriften (1851), edited by Adolph August Friedrich Rudorff, is a collection of essays on various branches of Roman law, and the preface contains a sympathetic biographical sketch of the jurist.

Published works 
 
 
 
 
 
 
 
 
  Published posthumously.
 
  Published posthumously.
  Published posthumously.

Bibliography
 

 .

References

1798 births
1846 deaths
People from Fürth (district)
Jurists from Bavaria
University of Erlangen-Nuremberg alumni
Academic staff of the University of Erlangen-Nuremberg
Academic staff of the Ludwig Maximilian University of Munich
Academic staff of the University of Marburg
Academic staff of Leipzig University
Academic staff of the Humboldt University of Berlin